Unai Dufur Espelosín (born 21 February 1999) is a Spanish footballer who plays as a central defender for CA Osasuna B.

Club career
Born in Pamplona, Dufur played for CP San Francisco, AD San Juan and SD Eibar as a youth. After making his senior debut with the second reserve team SD Eibar Urko in 2018, he was promoted to the farm team in Tercera División in July of the following year.

Dufur made his first team debut with the Armeros on 17 December 2020, starting in a 2–0 away win over Racing Rioja CF, for the season's Copa del Rey. His La Liga debut occurred the following 18 April, as he started in a 0–5 away loss against Atlético Madrid.

On 4 June 2021, Dufur signed a two-year contract with CA Osasuna, being initially assigned to the reserves in Segunda División RFEF.

Personal life
Dufur's younger brother Ander is also a footballer. A right back, both played together at San Juan.

References

External links

1999 births
Living people
Footballers from Pamplona
Spanish footballers
Association football defenders
La Liga players
Segunda Federación players
Tercera División players
Divisiones Regionales de Fútbol players
CD Vitoria footballers
SD Eibar footballers
CA Osasuna B players
CA Osasuna players